John Eustace is an English footballer.

John Eustace may also refer to:

John Chetwode Eustace, Anglo-Irish Catholic priest and antiquary
John Skey Eustace, colonel in the Continental Army in the American Revolution, and general in the French Revolutionary army
John Thomas Eustace, member of the Parliament of the Cape of Good Hope

See also